Horace Davis (March 16, 1831 – July 12, 1916) was a United States representative from California. He was the son of Massachusetts Governor John Davis and the younger brother of diplomat John Chandler Bancroft Davis.

Biography
Davis was born in Worcester, Massachusetts. He attended the Worcester public schools and Williams College, Williamstown, Massachusetts, graduated from Harvard University in 1849, and then studied law in the Dane Law School of Harvard University, but did not engage in professional pursuits by reason of failing eyesight.

Davis sailed for San Francisco, California, around Cape Horn in 1852, and upon arriving, engaged for a brief time as a gold miner, a lumber supercargo surveyor for a coastal steamer, and a purser for the Pacific Mail Steamship Company. In addition he helped found the Mercantile Library Association of California (its oldest public library). Under his administrative   tutelage interest in the library was restored with his creation of a library catalog (an act which later led to his poor eyesight). He resigned in 1855 and  relocated to San Francisco in 1860 at which time he established the highly successful Golden Gate Flouring Mills and the Sperry Flour Company. He was elected a member of the American Antiquarian Society in 1862. When the American Civil War broke out, he served in the secretive San Francisco-based Home Guard acting to secure both the loyalty of California to then Union President Abraham Lincoln and the election of Leland Stanford as governor of California (by patrolling the polls on election day). He presided over the Produce Exchange of San Francisco from 1867 to 1877 until he was elected as a Republican to the United States House of Representatives of the Forty-fifth and Forty-sixth Congresses (March 4, 1877 - March 3, 1881), where on June 8, 1878 he spoke in support of a bill  to restrict Chinese immigration. He was an unsuccessful candidate for reelection in 1880 to the Forty-seventh Congress.

After his retirement from the Produce Exchange of San Francisco he presided over both the San Francisco Chamber of Commerce 1883-1884 and the Savings and Loan Society 1885 and served as a member of the Republican National Committee 1880-1888. In February, 1888 he was elected president of the University of California, but resigned in April, 1890. He was named president of the board of trustees of Stanford University by its original founder and served in this capacity from 1885-1916 where he effected its consolidation with the Wilmerding and Lux schools. He served as president of the University of California 1887-1890.

Married twice and a devout Unitarian, he contributed greatly to Starr King School for the Ministry, (formerly the Pacific Unitarian School for the Ministry). He was an active student of history and literature, his most noted work being an essay entitled American Constitutions. He died after an appendicitis operation in San Francisco in 1916 and was buried in Cypress Lawn Cemetery.

See also
Davis political family

References

Johnson, Allen; Malone, Dumas. Dictionary of American Biography. vol. III. Charles Scribner's Sons, New York, N.Y. 1959.

External links 
 

1831 births
1916 deaths
1906 San Francisco earthquake
American librarians
American Unitarians
Harvard Law School alumni
Politicians from San Francisco
Politicians from Worcester, Massachusetts
People of California in the American Civil War
University of California, Berkeley faculty
University of California regents
Leaders of the University of California, Berkeley
Williams College alumni
Gardiner family
Republican Party members of the United States House of Representatives from California
Members of the American Antiquarian Society
19th-century American politicians
Stanford University trustees
Burials at Cypress Lawn Memorial Park